Pakistan competed in the 2017 Asian Winter Games in Sapporo and Obihiro, Japan from February 19 to 26. The country competed in one sport (two disciplines).

The Pakistani team consisted of 12 athletes (8 men and 4 women). This will be the first winter continental or global multi-sporting event in which Pakistan's team consists of women.

Competitors
The following table lists the Pakistani delegation per sport and gender.

Alpine skiing

Pakistan's alpine skiing squad consists of athletes (8 men and 4 women). The team is led by 2014 Winter Olympics participant Muhammad Karim.

Men

Women

Cross-country skiing

Pakistan's cross-country skiing team consists of four male athletes.

Men
Fazal Haq
Imran Khan
Ishaq Khan
Muhammad Zubair

See also
Pakistan at the 2018 Winter Olympics

References

Nations at the 2017 Asian Winter Games
Pakistan at the Asian Winter Games
2017 in Pakistani sport